Trisol may refer to:

 Trisol, desert planet featured in the 1999 episode "My Three Suns" from the American animated series Futurama
 Trisol Music Group, German business group and record label